The General Electric GE4 turbojet engine was designed in the late 1960s as the powerplant for the Boeing 2707 supersonic transport. The GE4 was a nine-stage, single-shaft, axial-flow turbojet based largely on the General Electric YJ93 which powered the North American XB-70 bomber. The Boeing 2707 was cancelled in 1971, putting an end to further work on the GE4.

Specifications (GE4/J5P)

Other Specifications
 Compressor inlet diameter: 60.6 in (1,539 mm)
 Exhaust nozzle diameter: 
 Noise:
 Takeoff: 104 dB
 Sideline: 117 dB
 Approach: 107 dB

See also

References

1960s turbojet engines
GE4